The Pavilion Hotel may refer to:

 The Pavilion (Vermont)
 Pavilion Hotel (Nebraska), listed on the National Register of Historic Places